Clouston is a surname. Notable people with the surname include:

A.E. Clouston (1908–1984), British test pilot
Al Clouston (1910–2004), Canadian storyteller and humourist known as "Uncle Al"
Brian Clouston (born 1935), British landscape architect
Cory Clouston (born 1969), Canadian ice hockey coach
Edward Clouston (1849–1912), Canadian banker and financier
James Campbell Clouston (1900–1940), Canadian officer of the Royal Navy, killed at Dunkirk
Scott Clouston (born 1987), Australian rules footballer
J. Storer Clouston (1870–1944), Orcadian author and historian
Thomas Clouston (1840–1915), Scottish psychiatrist
Thomas E. Clouston (1848–1913), Presbyterian minister and academic in New South Wales
Wilfred Clouston (1916–1980), New Zealand flying ace of the Second World War
William Alexander Clouston (1843–1896), British folklorist